Ryan O'Connor (born January 12, 1992) is a Canadian professional ice hockey defenceman. He is currently playing with the Iserlohn Roosters of the Deutsche Eishockey Liga (DEL).

Playing career
O'Connor played major junior hockey in the Ontario Hockey League with the Barrie Colts and Saginaw Spirit. Undrafted, O'Connor made his Kontinental Hockey League (KHL) debut playing with KHL Medveščak during the 2013–14 season, on loan from HC Davos of the Swiss National League A

On July 21, 2014, O'Connor continued his career abroad in agreeing to a one-year contract with Finnish Liiga club, the Espoo Blues.

Following the 2018–19 season, his third with HIFK, O'Connor left the Liiga as a free agent, securing a one-year contract with German club, the Iserlohn Roosters of the DEL, on April 23, 2019.

References

External links

1992 births
Living people
Barrie Colts players
Canadian expatriate ice hockey players in Croatia
Canadian expatriate ice hockey players in Switzerland
Canadian expatriate sportspeople in Finland
Canadian ice hockey defencemen
Espoo Blues players
HC Davos players
HIFK (ice hockey) players
Ice hockey people from Ontario
Iserlohn Roosters players
KooKoo players
KHL Medveščak Zagreb players
Saginaw Spirit players
Sportspeople from Hamilton, Ontario